Margański & Mysłowski Zakłady Lotnicze (Margański & Mysłowski Aviation Works) is a Polish aircraft and glider manufacturer, located in Bielsko-Biała. It designs and manufactures unlimited category aerobatic gliders and powered aircraft, wind turbines and composite structures.

At first it repaired gliders. In the 1990s it undertook design work and designed  gliders for Swift and MDM. The main designer was Edward Margański.

In 2001 the company started work on utility and training aircraft of composite construction and the corporate identity became E. Margański i Wspólnicy (E. Margański & Partners), a limited partnership. In 2005 the corporate identity was again revised to become a limited liability company, Margański and Mysłowski Zakłady Lotnicze Sp. z o.o. In 2011 company's status has been changed to Joint-stock company and its full name has been changed to Zakłady Lotnicze Margański & Mysłowski S.A.

Designs
Swift S-1 (single-seat aerobatic glider)
MDM-1 Fox (two-seater aerobatic glider)
 Malgosia (motor Fox)
 Solo-Fox (conversion of the MDM-1 Fox prototype into a single seater)
EM-10 Bielik (low-cost jet aeroplane for fighter pilots training)
EM-11 Orka (four-seater touring / executive aircraft)

References

External links

 Zakłady Lotnicze Margański and Mysłowski S.A.

Aircraft manufacturers of Poland
Wind turbine manufacturers
Polish brands